Taylorstown, Pennsylvania is a census-designated place in Blaine Township, Washington County, Pennsylvania, United States.  Taylorstown has been assigned the ZIP codes 15323 and 15365.  As of the 2010 census the population of Taylorstown was 217 residents.  Film Director Cody Knotts, best known for Pro Wrestlers vs. Zombies, grew up here.

It is home to the Taylorstown Historic District.  Pennsylvania Route 221 runs through it.

Demographics

References

Census-designated places in Washington County, Pennsylvania